Tor Halvor Bjørnstad (born 17 May 1978) is a retired Norwegian cross-country skier, biathlete and winter triathlete.

He made his World Cup debut in March 2002 in Holmenkollen, with a 30th place in the 50 km race. In the same race in 2006 he finished 28th, and in the same race in 2008 he finished 27th.

He formerly represented the sports club Bækkelagets SK, currently Tynset IF, while also residing in Tynset.

Cross-country skiing results
All results are sourced from the International Ski Federation (FIS).

World Cup

Season standings

References

1978 births
Living people
People from Tynset
Norwegian male cross-country skiers
Norwegian male biathletes
Sportspeople from Innlandet